Eumachiaia frutescens, commonly known as turkey bush, is a species of flowering plant in the family Rubiaceae native to north Queensland in Australia.

References

Palicoureeae
Flora of Queensland
Plants described in 1942